The Combination of the Safe is a 1912 American silent short film. The director is unknown.

Cast

Stuart Holmes: The Detective
Earle Foxe: Atland Harrison(Thief)
George W. Middleton: Smith Weston (Diamond Importer)

External links

1912 films
American silent short films
American black-and-white films
Kalem Company films
American crime drama films
1910s crime drama films
1912 drama films
1910s American films
Silent American drama films